Steven Douglas Merryday (born November 2, 1950) is a United States district judge of the United States District Court for the Middle District of Florida.

During the COVID-19 pandemic, Merryday issued rulings that blocked the CDC from enforcing its public health rules regarding cruise ship operations and blocked the Navy from removing an insubordinate commander of a $1.8 billion warship who refused to comply with COVID-19 precautions and exposed others to COVID-19 while experiencing symptoms.

Education and career

Merryday was born in Palatka, Florida. He graduated with a Bachelor of Arts degree as valedictorian from the University of Florida in 1972 and with a Juris Doctor from the University of Florida College of Law in 1975. As a law student, Merryday served as student body president of the University of Florida. Merryday was in private practice in Tampa, Florida from 1975 to 1992.

Federal judicial service 

President George H. W. Bush nominated Merryday to the United States District Court for the Middle District of Florida on September 23, 1991, to a new seat created by 104 Stat. 5089. Confirmed by the Senate on February 6, 1992, and received his commission on February 10, 1992. He served as Chief Judge from August 1, 2015, to November 1, 2020.

Notable rulings 

On June 18, 2021, he ruled against the Centers For Disease Control (CDC) rules on cruise ships safety measures; saying,"[T]he agency’s conditional sail order— (a framework of regulations dictating how cruises can restart in the U.S. during the COVID-19 pandemic)— "can remain in place for Florida cruises only until July 18", thereby granting Governor Ron DeSantis' request for a preliminary injunction while the full case moves forward. Although he also noted in his ruling "After July 18, the rules will turn into non-binding recommendations for cruise companies. The CDC has until July 2 to propose a more limited set of cruise regulations to the court." Thus giving the CDC some time to either appeal his ruling by The United States Department of Justice or provide more narrow rules as stated in his decision.

In turn, Merryday's opinion was temporarily blocked on July 17 by the United States Court of Appeals for the Eleventh Circuit. This allowed the CDC to continue to implement safety protocols on the cruise industry. The Court of Appeals vacated the stay a few days later allowing Merryday's ruling to take effect.

In 2022, Merryday blocked the Navy from removing the commander of a $1.8 billion warship. The commander refused to get vaccinated, thus failing to comply with Navy policy. The refusal to get vaccinated would prevent the warship from going to port in countries with vaccine requirements. Merryday forced the Navy to retain the commander. As a consequence, the $1.8 billion warship was kept in port. The commander engaged in other forms of insubordination and deception, which included refusing to get tested for COVID while experiencing symptoms, exposing others to COVID while having symptoms, and traveling to high-risk areas without disclosing it. Navy vice admiral Daniel W. Dwyer characterized the commander as a "manifest national security concern... It is untenable that a subordinate commander may choose to disregard, modify, or half-heartedly execute a senior officer’s orders due to his or her personal beliefs... [this insubordination] degrades mission effectiveness and the ability of the strike group to perform its mission in the interest of U.S. national security."

References

Sources

1950 births
Living people
20th-century American judges
21st-century American judges
Fredric G. Levin College of Law alumni
Judges of the United States District Court for the Middle District of Florida
People from Palatka, Florida
United States district court judges appointed by George H. W. Bush
University of Florida alumni